Regionalverkehr Alb-Bodensee, formerly DB ZugBus Regionalverkehr Alb-Bodensee, is a transport company that operates bus services in the German state of Baden-Württemberg. It is a wholly owned subsidiary of DB Regio, itself a subsidiary of Deutsche Bahn.

History 
Prior to the December 2021 timetable the company, under the name DB ZugBus Regionalverkehr Alb-Bodensee, operated various regional rail services in Baden-Württemberg in addition to bus services. DB Regio restructured the company, with the rail services transferred to DB Regio Baden-Württemberg.

References

External links 
 

Public bus companies of Germany
Deutsche Bahn